Špela Bračun (born 3 August 1977 in Škofja Loka) is a Slovenian former alpine skier who competed in the 1998 Winter Olympics and 2002 Winter Olympics.

World Cup results

Season standings

Race podiums

External links
 sports-reference.com

1977 births
Living people
Slovenian female alpine skiers
Olympic alpine skiers of Slovenia
Alpine skiers at the 1998 Winter Olympics
Alpine skiers at the 2002 Winter Olympics
People from Škofja Loka